The Ford EDIS or Electronic Distributorless Ignition System is a computer-controlled ignition system developed by Ford that uses an ignition coil for each pair of cylinders (wasted spark). All the coils are placed in a single module called a coilpack.

Mazda 323

Vehicles with EDIS 
Ford used the EDIS module on a number of vehicles from 1988 to 199X.

EDIS-4 
The EDIS-4 module is used on the following vehicles equipped with the Ford HCS engine, and the 1.9-liter straight-4 Ford CVH engine, between 1988 and 1993:
 Ford Escort / Mercury Tracer
 Ford Fiesta (Europe)
 Ford Escort (Europe)
 Ford Sierra (Europe)
 Ford Scorpio (Europe)
 Ford Mondeo (Europe)
This system was also used on the 1995–2001 4-cylinder Ford Rangers and 1995–2001 Mazda B2300, B2500. But was incorporated into the EEC-V ECU, so there is no external module.

EDIS-6 
The EDIS-6 module is used on the following vehicles equipped with the 4.0L Ford Cologne V6 engine and 3.8L Ford Essex V6 engine between 1990 and 1997:
 Ford Ranger / Mazda B-Series
 Ford Explorer / Mazda Navajo
 Ford Aerostar
 Ford Mustang (3.8L V6)
 Ford Thunderbird Supercoupe
 Ford Taurus SHO V6 (1989–1995)
 Ford Windstar
The European Ford Scorpio 2.9 V6 24V Cosworth also uses the EDIS-6 module.

EDIS-8 
The EDIS-8 module is used on the following vehicles equipped with the 4.6-liter V-8 Ford Modular engine between 1990 and 1997:
 Lincoln Town Car, Mark VIII
 Ford Crown Victoria / Mercury Grand Marquis
 Ford Thunderbird / Mercury Cougar
 Ford Mustang

The EDIS-8 Module was also used in Some later 5.0L Ford Explorers until around 2002

Aftermarket use in non-Ford vehicles 
The EDIS system's relative simplicity, in particular the fact it does not require a cam sensor, makes it a popular choice for custom car builders and classic car owners looking to retrofit a modern ignition system to their vehicle. The crankshaft-mounted trigger wheel, VR sensor, EDIS Module and an ignition control computer can all be easily fitted to most older engines that originally used a traditional distributor for ignition.

See also 
 Profile ignition pickup

References 
 US Patent Number 4,661,778: Ignition diagnostic monitor
 US Patent Number 4,922,874: Automobile electronic control modules communicating by pulse width modulated signals
 US Patent Number 5,014,676: Ignition system with repetitive sparks
 Ford EDIS technical information
 MegasquirtnSpark-extra EDIS mode
 US Patent Number 6,115,665: Memory Efficient Computer System And Method For Controlling An Automotive Ignition System
 E-Type UK EDIS/Megajolt Ignition Support Thread

Ford Motor Company
Automotive technology tradenames